Topias Miikka Taavitsainen (born 14 April 1998), better known as Topson, is a Finnish professional Dota 2 player. As a member of OG, he won The International 2018 and The International 2019.

Early life
Topias Miikka Taavitsainen was born in Haukipudas, Finland on 14 April 1998. He has seven brothers and four sisters. At the encouragement of his brothers, he began playing Defense of the Ancients when he was eight years old. His father owns a construction company and grew up as Laestadian family. His parents were doubtful if playing video games as a career would be profitable, but his eventual success of winning tournaments surprised his mother. He originally studied to be an electrician but transferred to a cooking school after one year.

Career
Taavitsainen made appearances on lower-level squads in events before his big breakthrough. While none of these teams made an impact, his gameplay got noticed. His breakout for professional scene moment came in 2017. He had joined the Russian organisation SFT e-sports, where they had decided to pick up an entirely new roster. It was the first time that he had played for a high-tier team. After trying his luck with several teams, he focused on streaming and soon topped the European region by way of MMR. He was then recruited to join OG in 2018.

Prior to The International 2018, OG lost three members of its roster with co-founder and captain Fly and s4 leaving to join Evil Geniuses and Resolut1on being released from his contract. With majority of top level players already being committed to teams for the upcoming competition, OG offered a position to Taavitsainen who was at that point an unproven newbie who had never participated in a major LAN event. Due to such late roster change, OG was no longer eligible to be directly invited to The International 2018 and instead qualified through Open Qualifiers. 

Following that, OG were then placed into group A of The International's group stage, finishing fourth with a record of 9–7, which seeded them into the upper bracket. There, OG won every series to advance to the grand finals. Facing the lower bracket winner PSG.LGD in it, whom OG had just defeated in the upper bracket finals, OG won the game one, but lost the next two games. Needing another win to avoid losing the series, OG forced a late-game comeback in game four, and subsequently won game five in a similar fashion, making them International champions and winning them over $11 million in prize money. Their victory was considered a Cinderella and underdog success story, as they had come from the open qualifiers and had beaten some of the more favored and accomplished teams along the way.

OG and Taavitsainen continued their reign as The International 2019 champions, defeating Team Liquid 3–1. In addition, Topson also was named the tournament's MVP.

Playstyle
Prior to The International 2018, Taavitsainen was considered to be one of weaker middle laners due to his unorthodox hero pool, questionable in-game strategic choices, and tendency to lose the middle lane. Taavitsainen's style has been described a being more selfless than most professional middle laners, focusing less on individual excellence and snowball potential and more on creating space for his team.

References

External links

1998 births
Living people
Dota players
OG (esports) players
Finnish esports players
20th-century Finnish people
Laestadians